The foot (: feet) is an anatomical structure found in many vertebrates. It is the terminal portion of a limb which bears weight and allows locomotion. In many animals with feet, the foot is a separate organ at the terminal part of the leg made up of one or more segments or bones, generally including claws and or nails.

Etymology
The word "foot", in the sense of meaning the "terminal part of the leg of a vertebrate animal" comes from "Old English fot "foot," from Proto-Germanic *fot (source also of Old Frisian fot, Old Saxon fot, Old Norse fotr, Danish fod, Swedish fot, Dutch voet, Old High German fuoz, German Fuß, Gothic fotus "foot"), from PIE root *ped- "foot".
The "plural form feet is an instance of i-mutation."

Structure

The human foot is a strong and complex mechanical structure containing 26 bones, 33 joints (20 of which are actively articulated), and more than a hundred muscles, tendons, and ligaments. The joints of the foot are the ankle and subtalar joint and the interphalangeal joints of the foot. An anthropometric study of 1197 North American adult Caucasian males (mean age 35.5 years) found that a man's foot length was 26.3 cm with a standard deviation of 1.2 cm.

The foot can be subdivided into the hindfoot, the midfoot, and the forefoot:

The hindfoot is composed of the talus (or ankle bone) and the calcaneus (or heel bone). The two long bones of the lower leg, the tibia and fibula, are connected to the top of the talus to form the ankle. Connected to the talus at the subtalar joint, the calcaneus, the largest bone of the foot, is cushioned underneath by a layer of fat.

The five irregular bones of the midfoot, the cuboid, navicular, and three cuneiform bones, form the arches of the foot which serves as a shock absorber. The midfoot is connected to the hind- and fore-foot by muscles and the plantar fascia.

The forefoot is composed of five toes and the corresponding five proximal long bones forming the metatarsus. Similar to the fingers of the hand, the bones of the toes are called phalanges and the big toe has two phalanges while the other four toes have three phalanges each. The joints between the phalanges are called interphalangeal and those between the metatarsus and phalanges are called metatarsophalangeal (MTP).

Both the midfoot and forefoot constitute the dorsum (the area facing upward while standing) and the planum (the area facing downward while standing).

The instep is the arched part of the top of the foot between the toes and the ankle.

Bones

 tibia, fibula
 tarsus (7): talus, calcaneus, cuneiformes (3), cuboid, and navicular
 metatarsus (5): first, second, third, fourth, and fifth metatarsal bone
 phalanges (14)

There can be many sesamoid bones near the metatarsophalangeal joints, although they are only regularly present in the distal portion of the first metatarsal bone.

Arches

The human foot has two longitudinal arches and a transverse arch maintained by the interlocking shapes of the foot bones, strong ligaments, and pulling muscles during activity. The slight mobility of these arches when weight is applied to and removed from the foot makes walking and running more economical in terms of energy. As can be examined in a footprint, the medial longitudinal arch curves above the ground. This arch stretches from the heel bone over the "keystone" ankle bone to the three medial metatarsals. In contrast, the lateral longitudinal arch is very low. With the cuboid serving as its keystone, it redistributes part of the weight to the calcaneus and the distal end of the fifth metatarsal. The two longitudinal arches serve as pillars for the transverse arch which run obliquely across the tarsometatarsal joints. Excessive strain on the tendons and ligaments of the feet can result in fallen arches or flat feet.

Muscles
The muscles acting on the foot can be classified into extrinsic muscles, those originating on the anterior or posterior aspect of the lower leg, and intrinsic muscles, originating on the dorsal (top) or plantar (base) aspects of the foot.

Extrinsic

All muscles originating on the lower leg except the popliteus muscle are attached to the bones of the foot. The tibia and fibula and the interosseous membrane separate these muscles into anterior and posterior groups, in their turn subdivided into subgroups and layers.

Anterior group
Extensor group: the tibialis anterior originates on the proximal half of the tibia and the interosseous membrane and is inserted near the tarsometatarsal joint of the first digit. In the non-weight-bearing leg, the tibialis anterior dorsiflexes the foot and lift its medial edge (supination). In the weight-bearing leg, it brings the leg toward the back of the foot, like in rapid walking. The extensor digitorum longus arises on the lateral tibial condyle and along the fibula, and is inserted on the second to fifth digits and proximally on the fifth metatarsal. The extensor digitorum longus acts similar to the tibialis anterior except that it also dorsiflexes the digits. The extensor hallucis longus originates medially on the fibula and is inserted on the first digit. It dorsiflexes the big toe and also acts on the ankle in the unstressed leg. In the weight-bearing leg, it acts similarly to the tibialis anterior.

Peroneal group: the peroneus longus arises on the proximal aspect of the fibula and peroneus brevis below it. Together, their tendons pass behind the lateral malleolus. Distally, the peroneus longus crosses the plantar side of the foot to reach its insertion on the first tarsometatarsal joint, while the peroneus brevis reaches the proximal part of the fifth metatarsal. These two muscles are the strongest pronators and aid in plantar flexion. The peroneus longus also acts like a bowstring that braces the transverse arch of the foot.

Posterior group
The superficial layer of posterior leg muscles is formed by the triceps surae and the plantaris. The triceps surae consists of the soleus and the two heads of the gastrocnemius. The heads of gastrocnemius arise on the femur, proximal to the condyles, and the soleus arises on the proximal dorsal parts of the tibia and fibula. The tendons of these muscles merge to be inserted onto the calcaneus as the Achilles tendon. The plantaris originates on the femur proximal to the lateral head of the gastrocnemius and its long tendon is embedded medially into the Achilles tendon. The triceps surae is the primary plantar flexor. Its strength becomes most obvious during ballet dancing. It is fully activated only with the knee extended, because the gastrocnemius is shortened during flexion of the knee. During walking it not only lifts the heel, but also flexes the knee, assisted by the plantaris.

In the deep layer of posterior muscles, the tibialis posterior arises proximally on the back of the interosseous membrane and adjoining bones, and divides into two parts in the sole of the foot to attach to the tarsus. In the non-weight-bearing leg, it produces plantar flexion and supination, and, in the weight-bearing leg, it proximates the heel to the calf. The flexor hallucis longus arises on the back of the fibula on the lateral side, and its relatively thick muscle belly extends distally down to the flexor retinaculum where it passes over to the medial side to stretch across the sole to the distal phalanx of the first digit. The popliteus is also part of this group, but, with its oblique course across the back of the knee, does not act on the foot.

Intrinsic
On the top of the foot, the tendons of extensor digitorum brevis and extensor hallucis brevis lie deep in the system of long extrinsic extensor tendons. They both arise on the calcaneus and extend into the dorsal aponeurosis of digits one to four, just beyond the penultimate joints. They act to dorsiflex the digits. Similar to the intrinsic muscles of the hand, there are three groups of muscles in the sole of foot, those of the first and last digits, and a central group:

Muscles of the big toe: the abductor hallucis stretches medially along the border of the sole, from the calcaneus to the first digit. Below its tendon, the tendons of the long flexors pass through the tarsal canal. The abductor hallucis is an abductor and a weak flexor, and also helps maintain the arch of the foot. The flexor hallucis brevis arises on the medial cuneiform bone and related ligaments and tendons. An important plantar flexor, it is crucial to ballet dancing. Both these muscles are inserted with two heads proximally and distally to the first metatarsophalangeal joint. The adductor hallucis is part of this group, though it originally formed a separate system (see Contrahens). It has two heads, the oblique head originating obliquely across the central part of the midfoot, and the transverse head originating near the metatarsophalangeal joints of digits five to three. Both heads are inserted into the lateral sesamoid bone of the first digit. The adductor hallucis acts as a tensor of the plantar arches and also adducts the big toe and might plantar flex the proximal phalanx.

Muscles of the little toe: Stretching laterally from the calcaneus to the proximal phalanx of the fifth digit, the abductor digiti minimi form the lateral margin of the foot and are the largest of the muscles of the fifth digit. Arising from the base of the fifth metatarsal, the flexor digiti minimi is inserted together with abductor on the first phalanx. Often absent, the opponens digiti minimi originates near the cuboid bone and is inserted on the fifth metatarsal bone. These three muscles act to support the arch of the foot and to plantar flex the fifth digit.

Central muscle group: The four lumbricals arise on the medial side of the tendons of flexor digitorum longus and are inserted on the medial margins of the proximal phalanges. The quadratus plantae originates with two slips from the lateral and medial margins of the calcaneus and inserts into the lateral margin of the flexor digitorum tendon. It is also known as the flexor accessorius. The flexor digitorum brevis arises inferiorly on the calcaneus and its three tendons are inserted into the middle phalanges of digits two to four (sometimes also the fifth digit). These tendons divide before their insertions and the tendons of flexor digitorum longus pass through these divisions. Flexor digitorum brevis flexes the middle phalanges. It is occasionally absent. Between the toes, the dorsal and plantar interossei stretch from the metatarsals to the proximal phalanges of digits two to five. The plantar interossei adduct and the dorsal interossei abduct these digits, and are also plantar flexors at the metatarsophalangeal joints.

Clinical significance

Due to their position and function, feet are exposed to a variety of potential infections and injuries, including athlete's foot, bunions, ingrown toenails, Morton's neuroma, plantar fasciitis, plantar warts, and stress fractures. In addition, there are several genetic disorders that can affect the shape and function of the feet, including clubfoot or flat feet.

This leaves humans more vulnerable to medical problems that are caused by poor leg and foot alignments. Also, the wearing of shoes, sneakers and boots can impede proper alignment and movement within the ankle and foot. For example, high-heeled shoes are known to throw off the natural weight balance (this can also affect the lower back). For the sake of posture, flat soles with no heels are advised.

A doctor who specializes in the treatment of the feet practices podiatry and is called a podiatrist. A pedorthist specializes in the use and modification of footwear to treat problems related to the lower limbs.

Fractures of the foot include:
Lisfranc fracture – in which one or all of the metatarsals are displaced from the tarsus
Jones fracture – a fracture of the fifth metatarsal
March fracture – a fracture of the distal third of one of the metatarsals occurring because of recurrent stress
Calcaneal fracture
Broken toe – a fracture of a phalanx
Cuneiform fracture – Due to the ligamentous support of the midfoot, isolated cuneiform fractures are rare.

Pronation

In anatomy, pronation is a rotational movement of the forearm (at the radioulnar joint) or foot (at the subtalar and talocalcaneonavicular joints). Pronation of the foot refers to how the body distributes weight as it cycles through the gait. During the gait cycle the foot can pronate in many different ways based on rearfoot and forefoot function. Types of pronation include neutral pronation, underpronation (supination), and overpronation.

Neutral pronation
An individual who neutrally pronates initially strikes the ground on the lateral side of the heel. As the individual transfers weight from the heel to the metatarsus, the foot will roll in a medial direction, such that the weight is distributed evenly across the metatarsus. In this stage of the gait, the knee will generally, but not always, track directly over the hallux.

This rolling inward motion as the foot progresses from heel to toe is the way that the body naturally absorbs shock. Neutral pronation is the most ideal, efficient type of gait when using a heel strike gait; in a forefoot strike, the body absorbs shock instead via flexion of the foot.

Overpronation
As with a neutral pronator, an individual who overpronates initially strikes the ground on the lateral side of the heel. As the individual transfers weight from the heel to the metatarsus, however, the foot will roll too far in a medial direction, such that the weight is distributed unevenly across the metatarsus, with excessive weight borne on the hallux. In this stage of the gait, the knee will generally, but not always, track inward.

An overpronator does not absorb shock efficiently. Imagine someone jumping onto a diving board, but the board is so flimsy that when it is struck, it bends and allows the person to plunge straight down into the water instead of back into the air. Similarly, an overpronator's arches will collapse, or the ankles will roll inward (or a combination of the two) as they cycle through the gait. An individual whose bone structure involves external rotation at the hip, knee, or ankle will be more likely to overpronate than one whose bone structure has internal rotation or central alignment. An individual who overpronates tends to wear down their running shoes on the medial (inside) side of the shoe toward the toe area.

When choosing a running or walking shoe, a person with overpronation can choose shoes that have good inside support—usually by strong material at the inside sole and arch of the shoe. It is usually visible. The inside support area is marked by strong greyish material to support the weight when a person lands on the outside foot and then roll onto the inside foot.

Underpronation (supination)

An individual who underpronates also initially strikes the ground on the lateral side of the heel. As the individual transfers weight from the heel to the metatarsus, the foot will not roll far enough in a medial direction. The weight is distributed unevenly across the metatarsus, with excessive weight borne on the fifth metatarsal, toward the lateral side of the foot. In this stage of the gait, the knee will generally, but not always, track laterally of the hallux.

Like an overpronator, an underpronator does not absorb shock efficiently – but for the opposite reason. The underpronated foot is like a diving board that, instead of failing to spring someone in the air because it is too flimsy, fails to do so because it is too rigid. There is virtually no give. An underpronator's arches or ankles don't experience much motion as they cycle through the gait. An individual whose bone structure involves internal rotation at the hip, knee, or ankle will be more likely to underpronate than one whose bone structure has external rotation or central alignment. Usually – but not always – those who are bow-legged tend to underpronate. An individual who underpronates tends to wear down their running shoes on the lateral (outside) side of the shoe toward the rear of the shoe in the heel area.

Society and culture

Humans usually wear shoes or similar footwear for protection from hazards when walking outside. There are a number of contexts where it is considered inappropriate to wear shoes. Some people consider it rude to wear shoes into a house and a Māori Marae should only be entered with bare feet.

Foot fetishism is the most common sexual fetish.

Other animals

A paw is the soft foot of a mammal, generally a quadruped, that has claws or nails (e.g., a cat or dog's paw). A hard foot is called a hoof. Depending on style of locomotion, animals can be classified as plantigrade (sole walking), digitigrade (toe walking), or unguligrade (nail walking).

The metatarsals are the bones that make up the main part of the foot in humans, and part of the leg in large animals or paw in smaller animals. The number of metatarsals are directly related to the mode of locomotion with many larger animals having their digits reduced to two (elk, cow, sheep) or one (horse). The metatarsal bones of feet and paws are tightly grouped compared to, most notably, the human hand where the thumb metacarpal diverges from the rest of the metacarpus.

Metaphorical and cultural usage

The word "foot" is used to refer to a "...linear measure was in Old English (the exact length has varied over time), this being considered the length of a man's foot; a unit of measure used widely and anciently. In this sense the plural is often foot. The current inch and foot are implied from measurements in 12c."
The word "foot" also has a musical meaning; a "...metrical foot (late Old English, translating Latin pes, Greek pous in the same sense) is commonly taken to represent one rise and one fall of a foot: keeping time according to some, dancing according to others."

The word "foot" was used in Middle English to mean "a person" (c. 1200).
The expression "...to put one's best foot foremost first recorded 1849 (Shakespeare has the better foot before, 1596)". The expression to "...put one's foot in (one's) mouth "say something stupid" was first used in 1942. The expression "put (one's) foot in something" meaning to "make a mess of it" was used in 1823.

The word "footloose" was first used in the 1690s, meaning "free to move the feet, unshackled"; the more "figurative sense of "free to act as one pleases" was first used in 1873. Like "footloose", "flat-footed" at first had its obvious literal meaning (in 1600, it meant "with flat feet") but by 1912 it meant "unprepared" (U.S. baseball slang).

See also

Ball (foot)
Barefoot
Comparison of orthotics
Flat feet
Foot binding
Foot fetishism
Foot gymnastics
Gait analysis
Heel
Pedobarography (foot pressure analysis)
Pes cavus
Runner's toe, repetitive injury seen in runners
Sole (foot)
Squatting position

References

Bibliography

External links

 

 
Human body